Patrick Gabarrou a.k.a. "Le Gab" (born 19 July 1951 in Évreux), is a French mountaineer and mountain guide who is credited with more than 300 first ascents, most of them in the Mont Blanc massif.

He has been the president of the international environmental NGO Mountain Wilderness from 2006 to 2010. He is mostly an ice climber, and is considered to be a pioneer of the modern wave of ice climbing.

He also opened routes in several other regions like Canada, Bolivia and Patagonia.

First ascents

Mountain routes
 Boivin-Gabarrou on the north face of Les Droites (with Jean-Marc Boivin), 1975
 Supercouloir and Gabarrou-Albinoni on Mont Blanc du Tacul
 Hypercouloir on Mont Blanc (with Pierre-Alain Steiner), 1982
 Divine Providence on the Grand Pilier d'Angle, 1984
 Gabarrou-Silvy on the Aiguille Sans Nom, 1985
 Directissime on the Grandes Jorasses (with Hervé Bouvard), 1986
 Aux amis disparus on the Matterhorn (with Lionel Daudet)
 Directissime de la Margerita on Monte Rosa (with Christian Appertet), 1992
 Alexis on Point Whymper of the Grandes Jorasses (with Benoît Robert), 1993 
 A Leï on the Grandes Jorasses (with Philippe Batoux and Benoît Robert), February 2003
 Heidi on the Grandes Jorasses (with Philippe Batoux and Christophe Dumarest), 17–21 March 2005
 Ciao Walter on Mont-Blanc (with Simon Deniel and Ben O'Connor-Croft), 2012
 Brigite on the Arête des Grands Montets (with his wife Franca et Philippe Lansard), 5 April 2013
 René Croft between the Boivin-Gabarrou and the Barnoud-Marsigny on the north face of Les Droites (with Ben O'Connor-Croft), 25–26 April 2013
 Padre Pio, Une Echelle Vers le Ciel on the south face of Matterhorn, 2015 (see Alpinist article)

Ice climbs
 Cascade Notre Dame, 700 m, V, WI6 (with François Marsigny), 1984
 Freneysie Pascale, 1984
 Abominette, 700 m, IV, 5.8, WI3 (with Christophe Profit and Sylviane Tavernier), 1984
 Fantomastic, 700 m, V, WI6 (with François Marsigny), 1985
 Patagonic, 700 m, M6, V+, WI6, A1 (with Christophe Dumarest), 2003

Skiing
 First descent of the north face of the Col de Peuterey, with Jean-Marc Boivin, 1977
 Winner, French championship of ski-mountaineering 1989, together with Pierre d'Alboy
 Sixth place, Pierra Menta 1989, together with Pierre d'Alboy 
 Fourth, Pierra Menta 1991, together with Lionel Mailly
 First descent of the south face of the Tour Noir, with Ben O’Connor-Croft, 16 April 2013

References

External links
 Gabarrou's personal web site
 Summitpost on Gabarrou

Alpine guides
French mountain climbers
French male ski mountaineers
Sportspeople from Évreux
Living people
1951 births
Tibet freedom activists
Ice climbers